Lev Vinocour (born 3 August 1970) is a pianist from Russia.

He began his studies at the age of six. He studied at the School of Music in Saint Petersburg and continued his studies at the Moscow Conservatory under the direction of Lev Vlassenko.

He has won prizes in many competitions, such as Busoni International Competition, International Piano Competition in Epinal, France and the Gina Bachauer International Piano Competition. He has also recorded CDs, the most known being his performance of Schumann.

From the liner notes of his new album Robert Schumann: Complete Works for Piano and Orchestra (Lev Vinocour, Johannes Wildner & ORF Vienna Radio Symphony Orchestra):

Vinocour became  German citizen in 2002.

References

External links
homepage lev vinocour

Russian classical pianists
Male classical pianists
1970 births
Living people
Prize-winners of the Ferruccio Busoni International Piano Competition
Moscow Conservatory alumni
Saint Petersburg Conservatory alumni
Prize-winners of the Gina Bachauer International Piano Competition
21st-century classical pianists
21st-century Russian male musicians